Jorge Arcas Peña (born 8 July 1992) is a Spanish cyclist, who currently rides for UCI WorldTeam . He was named in the startlist for the 2017 Vuelta a España.

Major results
2015
 1st Stage 2 Vuelta a Navarra
 2nd Vuelta Ciclista a León

Grand Tour general classification results timeline

References

External links

1992 births
Living people
Spanish male cyclists
People from Alto Gállego
Sportspeople from the Province of Huesca
Cyclists from Aragon